Ropeadope Records is an American record label known for recordings in a variety of genres including jazz, hip hop, gospel, and electronic music. The label, now led by Louis Marks, was founded in 1999 by Andy Hurwitz in New York City and later moved to Philadelphia.

In January 2014, Ropeadope artists Snarky Puppy and Lalah Hathaway were awarded the Grammy for Best R&B Performance.

Roster & Releases 

Current and former artists:

 Adam Smale
 Alison Wedding
 Antibalas Afrobeat Orchestra
 Joey Arkenstat
 Ben Arnold
 Benevento/Russo Duo
 Bodega
 Bullfrog
 Brainbheats
 Cabinet
 Frank Catalano
 Carlon
 The Campbell Brothers
 Consider the Source
 Critters Buggin
 Hal Crook
 Darnell Little
 The Detroit Experiment
 DJ Klock
 DJ Logic
 Dirty Dozen Brass Band
 fDeluxe
 Mike Gordon
 Great Peacock
 The Harlem Experiment
 Taku Hirano
 Charlie Hunter
 HUW
 King Britt
 T.J. Kirk
 Jneiro Jarel
 Jazzanova
 Jonathan Scales Fourchestra
 M'lumbo
 Naughty Professor
 Karikatura
 Christian McBride
 Medeski, Martin and Wood
 Michael Kammers/MK Groove Orchestra & Trio
 None But The Righteous
 Paul Beaubrun
 The Philadelphia Experiment
 Bobby Previte
 Japhy Ryder
 Scratch
 Sex Mob
 Skerik's Syncopated Taint Septet
 Snarky Puppy
 Spanish Harlem Orchestra
 Spare Parts
 The Spinning Leaves
 Teddy Presberg
 Terrace Martin
 Tin Hat Trio
 Toy Soldiers
 Um
 The Word
 Yeni Nostalji
 The Yohimbe Brothers
Eddie Palmieri
RC & The Gritz

Releases

2001: Stray Dog by Hal Crook
2001: The Word by The Word
2001: The Philadelphia Experiment
2002: In Between (Jazzanova album)
2002: Front End Lifter by the Yohimbe Brothers (Vernon Reid and DJ Logic)
2003: Inside In by Mike Gordon
2003: Skerik's Syncopated Taint Septet (album)
2004: Friends Seen and Unseen
2005: Zen Of Logic (DJ Logic)
2006: The Coalition of the Willing by Bobby Previte
2006: Live at Tonic (Christian McBride)
2006: The Harlem Experiment
2007: Live at Tonic (Marco Benevento)
2008: Un-Herd Vol. 1 (Y?Arcka)
2011: Gaslight by fDeluxe
2012: GroundUP by Snarky Puppy
2014: Love Supreme Collective - EP by Frank Catalano
2015: Shoulder Season by Sidewalk Chalk
2015: Stretch Music by Christian Scott aTunde Adjuah 
2016: Velvet Portraits by Terrace Martin
2016: The Feel by RC & The Gritz
2017: Sabiduria by Eddie Palmieri
2017: Ruler Rebel by Christian Scott aTunde Adjuah
2017: Diaspora by Christian Scott aTunde Adjuah
2017: The Emancipation Procrastination by Christian Scott aTunde Adjuah
2018: Full Circle by Eddie Palmieri
2018: Mi Luz Mayor by Eddie Palmieri
2018: Gran Pavo Real by Great Peacock
2019: Ancestral Recall by Christian Scott aTunde Adjuah
2019: Analog World by RC & The Gritz
2019: Soul Flow by David Whitman
2020: Fairytale Aliens by M'lumbo with Page Hamilton
2020: Celestial Mechanics by M'lumbo with Jane Ira Bloom
2021: Blu York by Taku Hirano

Awards & Nominations

Grammy Awards 
Multiple artists at Ropeadope Records have been nominated for and won awards at the annual Grammy Awards.

Independent Music Awards

References

External links
Discogs
Official website

American record labels
Hip hop record labels
Jazz record labels